Pakistan Institute of Medical Sciences (abbreviated as PIMS) is a research oriented health sciences institute located in Islamabad, Pakistan. 

It is one of the region's leading tertiary level hospitals which includes 22 medical and surgical specialist centers. It provides medical training through the Quaid-e-Azam Postgraduate Medical College which was established on 1 February 1989.

Later on Shaheed Zulfiqar Ali Bhutto Medical University was established through act of parliament in 2013. The first vice chancellor was professor Dr. Javed Akram who served till 2018.

History
Established in 1985 the institute includes three semi-autonomous hospitals including the Islamabad Hospital (IH) which is a 592-bed hospital spread over 3.5 hectares, the 230 Bedded Children's Hospital spread over 1.6 hectares specializing in pediatric care and the 125 bedded Maternal & Child Health Care Centrel which specializes in obstetrics and gynaecology.

Hospital departments 
The medical care departments of the institute are:

 Anesthesia
 Blood Bank
 Burn Center
 Cardiology
 Critical Care
 Dentistry
 Dermatology
 General Medicine
 E.N.T.
 Gastroenterology
 Gynecology
 Neonatology
 Nephrology
 Neurology
 Neurosurgery
 Oncology
 Ophthalmology
 Pathology
 Plastic Surgery
 Psychiatry
 Pulmonology
 Radiology
 Rheumatology
 General surgery-I
 Urology
 Infectious disease

Treatment of patients
In 2018, according to PIMS Gastroenterology Department, there was a 30 per cent increase in patients at this hospital compared to the number of patients in 2016-17.

Teaching institutes 

The Medical colleges and school affiliated with the institute are:
 Quaid-e-Azam Postgraduate Medical College
 Federal Medical & Dental College
 College of Nursing (offer 02 year Post RN B.Sc, 04 year Generic BS Nursing and 01 year specialize Nsg courses in 07 sub-specialties)
 School of Nursing

References

External links 
 Official website

Hospital buildings completed in 1985
Teaching hospitals in Pakistan
Hospitals established in 1985
Buildings and structures in Islamabad
Pakistan federal departments and agencies
1985 establishments in Pakistan
Hospitals in Islamabad